Michael R. Fontham is a legal author, a law professor, and a practicing attorney and partner at the Stone Pigman law firm.  He is the author of Trial Technique and Evidence and the lead author of Persuasive Written and Oral Advocacy: In Trial and Appellate Courts.  He currently teaches as an adjunct professor of law at the Tulane University Law School and the Louisiana State University Schools of Law, and previously served as a visiting professor at the University of Virginia School of Law (1982–83).  He served as an attorney to the late John G. Schwegmann, a pioneer in the development of the modern supermarket.

Education
Fontham received his J.D. degree from the University of Virginia School of Law in 1971. He was selected to the Order of the Coif and was a member of the Virginia Law Review, 1969–71. He received his undergraduate degree from Louisiana State University in 1968.

Awards
Three-time recipient of the Monte Lemann Award at Tulane for distinguished teaching
Recognized by the magazine The Best Lawyers in America
Selected by "Chambers U.S.A. America's Leading Lawyers for Business" in the field of public utility law

Books
Trial Technique and Evidence
Lead author of Persuasive Written and Oral Advocacy in Trial and Appellate Courts

References

External links
Professional profile at Stone Pigman's website
Professional profile at martindale.com

Year of birth missing (living people)
Living people
Tulane University Law School faculty
Tulane University faculty
University of Virginia School of Law alumni
Louisiana State University alumni
Louisiana lawyers